Edwin Wright may refer to:

Edwin M. Wright (1897–1987), American foreign policy specialist
Edwin R. V. Wright (1812–1871), U.S. Representative from New Jersey
Edwin Kennedy Wright (1898–1983), US Army officer and Deputy Director of the US Central Intelligence Agency
 Tré Cool (Frank Edwin Wright III) - member of band Green Day

See also
Ed Wright (disambiguation)